Roberto Osuna Quintero Jr. (born February 7, 1995) is a Mexican professional baseball pitcher for the Fukuoka SoftBank Hawks of Nippon Professional Baseball (NPB). He has played in Major League Baseball (MLB) for the Toronto Blue Jays and Houston Astros.

Osuna was signed by the Blue Jays out of Mexico as a 16-year-old, and played three seasons in their minor league organization. On April 8, 2015, at 20 years of age he became the youngest pitcher to appear in a game for the organization, and the first player born in 1995 to play in Major League Baseball. In 2017 he was an American League All Star. In 2018, he was suspended for 75 games for violating the league's policy on domestic assault. In 2019 he led the American League with 38 saves.

Early life
Osuna was born in Juan José Ríos, Sinaloa, Mexico.  At age 11 he dropped out of school to pick vegetables to help support his family. When he was 16 years old the Toronto Blue Jays signed him with a $1.5 million signing bonus.

Professional career

Minor leagues
Osuna made his professional baseball debut with the Diablos Rojos del México of the Mexican League in 2011. In 13 appearances totaling 19 innings, he pitched to a 0–1 record, 5.49 earned run average (ERA), and 12 strikeouts.

In August 2011, Osuna was acquired by the Blue Jays for $1.5 million. He began the 2012 season with the Bluefield Blue Jays of the Appalachian League, but was promoted to the Vancouver Canadians of the Northwest League after posting a 1–0 record with a 1.50 earned run average in seven appearances (four starts). He made his Canadians debut on July 28, 2012, striking out a franchise-record 13 batters over five innings pitched. In total, Osuna pitched 43 innings in 2012, and posted a 2–0 record, 2.27 ERA, and 49 strikeouts.

On January 29, 2013, Osuna was ranked 90th on MLB's Top 100 Prospects list. He started the 2013 season with the Class-A Lansing Lugnuts of the Midwest League. On May 9, 2013, it was announced that Osuna had torn his ulnar collateral ligament, an injury that usually requires Tommy John surgery. He met with Dr. James Andrews, and was advised to rest and rehab the injury, rather than undergo surgery. Osuna returned from the disabled list on June 9, and pitched five shutout innings for Lansing. Despite his attempt to rehab his elbow, Osuna underwent Tommy John surgery in late June. On July 26, he was ranked 58th on MLB's revised Top 100 Prospects list, and the number two prospect in the Blue Jays organization.

Osuna made his first rehab appearance since the procedure on July 8, 2014, and pitched one inning for the Gulf Coast League Blue Jays. He was then promoted to the High-A Dunedin Blue Jays and made seven starts before the end of the season, posting a 0–2 record, a 6.55 ERA, and 30 strikeouts in 22 innings pitched. In the 2015 preseason prospect rankings, he was named the number six prospect in the Blue Jays organization by MLB.

Toronto Blue Jays

2015

Osuna was invited to spring training in 2015 as a non-roster invitee. While initially not expecting to have any chance at making the major league team out of camp, Osuna impressed Blue Jays management through the first half of the spring. On March 22, he started a game against the Tampa Bay Rays and pitched 3 scoreless innings. After Steve Delabar was optioned to minor league camp on March 26, it was reported that Osuna would likely make the Opening Day roster as a reliever. His position on the roster was confirmed on March 31.

Osuna made his Major League debut in a game against the New York Yankees on April 8, 2015, striking out Alex Rodriguez and getting Stephen Drew to flyout. In making his debut, Osuna became the youngest pitcher to appear in a Major League game for Toronto, at 20 years and 60 days old. Through the first month of the season, Osuna became the most reliable arm in the bullpen for the Blue Jays, posting a 1.38 ERA through his first 10 appearances. He earned his first win on May 18, pitching 1 scoreless innings in a 10–6 victory over the Los Angeles Angels of Anaheim. In doing so, Osuna became the youngest pitcher to earn a win for the Blue Jays, at 20 years and 100 days old. He earned his first career save on June 22, closing out an 8–5 win over the Tampa Bay Rays. On August 7, Osuna became the youngest player in MLB history to record an extra-innings save, when he closed out a 2–1 win over the New York Yankees in the tenth inning. Osuna finished the 2015 regular season with a 1–6 record, 20 saves, 2.58 ERA, and 75 strikeouts in 69 innings pitched, and was the youngest player in the AL.

In the 2015 American League Division Series, Osuna recorded a five-out save in the fifth and final game, and in doing so became the youngest pitcher in American League history to record a save in the postseason, as well as the second-youngest to do so in MLB history, behind Don Gullett in 1970. Osuna pitched in 4 of the 5 ALDS games, and did not allow a baserunner in 5 innings pitched. He finished fourth in American League Rookie of the Year, receiving two second-place votes and two third-place votes.

2016
During the offseason, the Blue Jays acquired reliever Drew Storen, who had been the Washington Nationals' closer for part of the 2015 season. After a competition between Osuna and Storen for the closer's role in spring training, manager John Gibbons announced on March 30 that Osuna would begin the season as the Blue Jays closer. He earned his first save of the season on April 3 (Opening Day), sealing a 5–3 win for Marcus Stroman. On August 13, Osuna closed out a 4–2 win over the Houston Astros to earn the 46th save of his career, which tied the mark set by Terry Forster for saves recorded before the age of 22. He would break the tie with Forster on August 17, saving a 7–4 win over the New York Yankees. Osuna earned his 30th save of the 2016 season on September 4, becoming the 11th pitcher in franchise history to record 30 saves in a season. The save was also the 50th of his career, making him the youngest pitcher in MLB history to reach 50 saves.

Osuna finished the 2016 regular season with a 4–3 record, 2.68 ERA, 82 strikeouts, and 36 saves (6th in the AL) in 74 innings pitched over 72 games (4th) as he finished 61 games (2nd) and was the 4th-youngest player in the AL. In the postseason, he added nine innings and did not allow a run. He also earned his first career postseason win, pitching two perfect innings in the Blue Jays' decisive Game 3 victory of the ALDS

On December 5, 2016, Osuna committed to play for Team Mexico at the 2017 World Baseball Classic.

2017
Osuna was diagnosed with a cervical spasm late in spring training and started the 2017 season on the 10-day disabled list. On June 24, it was revealed that Osuna was dealing with an anxiety issue. To that point in the season, he had recorded 19 saves and a 2.48 ERA, and had become the youngest player in MLB history to reach 75 career saves. Osuna made his return to the mound the following day, pitching the final inning of the Blue Jays' 8–2 victory over the Kansas City Royals. On July 7, Osuna was added to the American League roster for the 2017 Major League Baseball All-Star Game. Osuna earned his 35th save of the season on August 31, and in doing so, became the first player in franchise history to have back-to-back seasons with at least 35 saves. He finished the season with 39 saves (2nd in the AL) and a 3–4 record, 3.38 ERA, and 83 strikeouts in 64 innings (11.7 per 9 innings) as he finished 58 games (2nd). However, he led the majors in blown saves, with 10.

2018
Osuna was unable to come to an agreement on a contract with the Blue Jays for 2018, leading to salary arbitration. On February 3, he lost his case with the Blue Jays and was signed to a one-year, $5.3 million contract. Osuna recorded his 100th career save in Toronto's 2–1 win over the Baltimore Orioles on April 10. In doing so, he became the youngest pitcher in MLB history to reach 100 saves. On June 22, Osuna was suspended for 75 games, retroactive to May 8, due to violating the league's policy on domestic assault.

Houston Astros

On July 30, 2018, the Blue Jays traded Osuna to the Houston Astros for pitchers Ken Giles, Héctor Pérez, and David Paulino. The Astros reinstated him to their active roster on August 5. He was loudly booed in his first appearance in Toronto as a member of the Astros.  In 2018, between the two teams he was 2-2 with 21 saves and a 2.37 ERA.

In 2019, Osuna led the American League with 38 saves and 56 games finished. He also recorded a 2.63 ERA and 73 strikeouts in 65 innings. His 154 career saves at season's end were 10th-most among all active pitchers. 

On August 4, 2020, it was announced that Osuna was recommended to need Tommy John surgery. However, Osuna opted not to have the surgery and take the rest-and-rehab route instead. On October 29, 2020, Osuna was placed on outright waivers by the Astros and became a free agent.

On March 12, 2021, Osuna held a showcase for interested teams in the Dominican Republic.

Diablos Rojos del México (second stint)
On May 11, 2021, Osuna signed with the Diablos Rojos del México of the Mexican League. He finished the season with a 3–0 record, 1.09 ERA, and 12 saves over 24.2 innings pitched. In 2022, Osuna registered a 2–0 record with a 1.35 ERA and 6 saves over 13.1 innings. On May 31, 2022, Osuna was placed on the reserve list in order to pursue an opportunity in Asia.

Chiba Lotte Marines
On June 9, 2022, Osuna signed with the Chiba Lotte Marines of Nippon Professional Baseball.

Fukuoka SoftBank Hawks
On December 8, 2022, Osuna signed with the Fukuoka SoftBank Hawks.

Personal life

At the age of 12, Osuna quit school to help support his family, picking vegetables with his father, also named Roberto, who pitched in the Mexican League for 22 seasons and taught him to pitch while instructing him after the workday. Osuna's uncle, Antonio, pitched in Major League Baseball for 11 seasons, mostly with the Los Angeles Dodgers.

Osuna has a daughter, born in September 2017.

On May 8, 2018, Osuna was arrested by Toronto police and charged with assault. He allegedly assaulted Alejandra Roman Cota, the mother of his 3-year-old son. Roman Cota was visiting Toronto with their child. She returned to Mexico shortly afterward and refused to return to Toronto. Due to Roman Cota's refusal to testify, the prosecution withdrew the charge against Osuna in exchange for a peace bond, mandating that for one year he not have contact with the alleged victim without her consent. According to Toronto police sources Roman Cota expressed her intention to resume contact with Osuna.He was placed on administrative leave by MLB commissioner Rob Manfred.

On June 22, 2018, he received a 75-game suspension without pay for violating the league's domestic violence policy, retroactive to May 8.

See also

 Houston Astros award winners and league leaders
 List of baseball players who underwent Tommy John surgery
 List of Major League Baseball players from Mexico

References

External links

1995 births
Living people
American League All-Stars
Baseball players from Sinaloa
Bluefield Blue Jays players
Buffalo Bisons (minor league) players
Chiba Lotte Marines players
Diablos Rojos del México players
Dunedin Blue Jays players
Gulf Coast Blue Jays players
Houston Astros players
Lansing Lugnuts players
Major League Baseball players from Mexico
Major League Baseball pitchers
Mesa Solar Sox players
Mexican League baseball pitchers
Mexican expatriate baseball players in Canada
Mexican expatriate baseball players in Japan
Mexican expatriate baseball players in the United States
Toronto Blue Jays players
Vancouver Canadians players
2017 World Baseball Classic players